Claude Abravanel (16 July 1924 – 14 December 2012) was a Swiss-Israeli  pianist and composer of classical music.

Activities

He studied piano with Dinu Lipatti at the Geneva Conservatory of Music. He also studied composition with Arthur Honegger and piano with Yvonne Lefébure at the Ecole Normale de Musique in Paris. A lecturer and director of the library at the Jerusalem Academy of Music and Dance (Rubin Academy) until 1992, Abravanel became director of the Archives of Israeli Music at the Academy.

Ensemble compositions Chamber Music 

 Elegy,[ for low Voice & Flute]
 Four Songs [for Alto & Cello]
 Hymn of Praise on a Yemenite Motive [for high voice & piano]
 Les Amours de Ronsard, [for high voice & piano]
  Prelude, Aria & Postlude for clarinet & piano
Supplication, Choreographical Poem [for flute & piano]
Three Psalms [for High Voice & Piano]
 Tre Sonetti di Petrarca [for high voice & piano]

Personal history
Abravanel was born in Montreux, Switzerland, and settled in Israel in 1951.

See also
Aria
Chamber Music
Music of Israel
Petrarca
Pierre de Ronsard
Yemenite

References

Additional reference material
©The National Library of Israel. All rights reserved retrieved 23/9/11 
book written by  Abravanel retrieved 23/9/11

External links 
 israelcomposers
jnul

1924 births
2012 deaths
Israeli male composers
Israeli pianists
Jewish classical pianists
Librarians at the National Library of Israel
Swiss male composers
Swiss pianists
Male classical pianists
People from Montreux
20th-century Israeli composers